Liga ASOBAL 2004–05 season was the 15th since its establishment. A total of 16 teams competed this season for the championship.

Competition format
This season, the competition was played in a round-robin format, through 30 rounds. The team with most points earned wins the championship. The last two teams were relegated.

Overall standing

Conclusions
 Portland San Antonio—Champion and Handball Champion's League
 BM Ciudad Real—Handball Champion's League
 Caja España Ademar León—Handball Champion's League
 FC Barcelona Handbol—Handball Champion's League
 BM Valladolid—EHF Cup Winner's Cup
 BM Granollers—EHF Cup
 CD Bidasoa—EHF Cup
 SD Teucro—Relegated to División de Honor B
 BM Valencia—Relegated to División de Honor B

Liga ASOBAL seasons
1
Spain